Jonkman is a Dutch surname meaning "young man" (modern Dutch jongeman) or "bachelor" (archaic Dutch jongman). People with the surname include:

 Bartel J. Jonkman (1884– 1955), American (Michigan) politician
 (born 1984), Dutch track racing cyclist
 (born 1975), Dutch chess player
 Jan Anne Jonkman (1891–1976), Dutch politician, Minister of Colonial Affairs 1946–48
 Janneke Jonkman (born 1978), Dutch writer
 Joan Willem Schreuder Jonkman (1763–1796), Dutch officer in the Austrian army
Marjan Jonkman, Dutch fashion model
 Mark Jonkman (born 1986), Dutch cricketer, twin brother of Maurits
 Maurits Jonkman (born 1986), Dutch cricketer, twin brother of Mark

References

Dutch-language surnames